Turrialba Volcano National Park, or in Spanish the  is a National Park in the Central Conservation Area of Costa Rica that encompasses the area around the Turrialba Volcano in Cartago Province.

Major eruptions in the past include the years between 1864 and 1868.  Volcanism increased in the park starting in 2014 and has featured ash clouds that have repeatedly impacted portions of Costa Rica with deposits of gritty soot and caused temporary closures of Juan Santamaría International Airport in the capital city of San Jose.

Tourism
Besides the views of the crater, it is possible to see the Caribbean plains, Turrialba valley and Talamanca mountain range. There are eighty four species of birds and eleven species of mammals. 

A moderate to high difficulty hike is available to tourists, a previous phone reservation is required, the entry fee is set as CRC ₡1000 for residents and USD $12 for foreigners, and there is now a mandatory tour group guide fee of CRC ₡6000.

Tours start from 06:00 AM to 10:00 AM.

2012—2020 Closure
Due to eruptions, the park was closed to tourists from 2012, and reopened on 4 December 2020. Meanwhile new emergency shelters were created, the visitor center was renovated, and railings at lookout spots were added. A two kilometer perimeter closure around the crater is still in place.

Access
The main access is through Route 417, however as of December 2020 there is a conflict of interests between the owners of a farm, who want to declare the route private, and the government, so an alternative route is signaled along the way.

References

External links
Parque Nacional Volcan Turrialba (Spanish language)
Turrialba Volcano National Park at Costa Rica National Parks
Turrialba Volcano webcam
Scientific American photos of the massive March, 2015 Turrialba eruption

National parks of Costa Rica
Protected areas established in 1955
Geography of Cartago Province
Tourist attractions in Cartago Province
1955 establishments in Costa Rica